James Rice (26 September 1843 – 26 April 1882), English novelist, wrote a number of successful novels in collaboration with Walter Besant.

He was born in Northampton, and was educated at Cambridge University. 
He studied law, becoming a lawyer of Lincoln's Inn in 1871.

In 1868 he bought the publication Once a Week. It was loss-making, but made him acquainted with Besant. Together they had a successful collaboration, ended by Rice's death. He died in Redhill.

Works, all with Walter Besant
Ready-money Mortiboy (1872)
My Little Girl (1873)
With Harp and Crown (1874)
This Son of Vulcan (1876)
The Golden Butterfly (1876)
The Case of Mr Lucraft (1876) stories
The Monks of Thelema (1878)
By Celia's Arbour (1878)
'Twas in Trafalgar's Bay (1879) stories
The Seamy Side (1880)
The Chaplain of the Fleet (1881)
Sir Richard Whittington (1881)
All Sorts and Conditions of Men, An Impossible Story
The Ten Years Tenant (1881) stories

References

External links
 
 

1843 births
1882 deaths
People from Northampton
Alumni of Queens' College, Cambridge
English male novelists
19th-century English novelists
19th-century English male writers